Community marketing is a strategy to engage an audience in an active, non-intrusive prospect and customer conversation.

Definition 
Whereas marketing communication strategies such as advertising, promotion, PR, and sales all focus on attaining customers, community marketing focuses on the perceived needs of existing customers. This accomplishes four things for a business:

 Connects existing customers with prospects
 Connects prospects with each other
 Connects a company with customers/prospects to solidify loyalty
 Connects customers with customers to improve product adoption, satisfaction, etc.

There are two types:

 Organic or natural marketing occurs without the assistance of the company. Organic marketing is word-of-mouth marketing and is one of the most effective marketing methods
 Sponsored community marketing is promoted by company through activities like investments in the local community improvement initiatives or corporate social responsibility.

Skepticism among consumers as a result of blatant advertising and other unethical communications has affected the success of the sponsored form of community marketing. Continuing success in community marketing strategies has been found in engaging and cultivating the natural communities that form around their product/service.

Benefits
 Bi-directional communication with customers - Resulting in increased feedback, identification of customer needs, and a customer-focused product development
 Reduced Communication Barriers - Easily introduce messaging to customer audience regarding new products, Public relations strategies, or Damage control (news)
 Identify, engage, and leverage Advocates - Allow enthused and loyal customers to benefit your overall marketing through Word of mouth and Knowledge Management that reduces the load on your internal support mechanisms (particularly for tech products).
 Gaining Trusted Advisor Status - Reduced skepticism towards your marketing message as a result of a demonstrated openness, transparency, and commitment to customer focus through Community Marketing involvement. Results in an "ownership" of the discussion surrounding a product/service that reduces negativity and positions the providing company as a resource, rather than simply a vendor.

Tools used
 Online Social Networking - The chief medium for Community Marketing revolves around Web 2.0 interactivity such as Internet forums, Wiki's, Social networks, Blogs, and related syndication (RSS).
 Community-Specific Tools & Features - To encourage community participation, many companies offer tools and features exclusively to "members" of the community. These include Webcasts, Podcasts, and email bulletins. The key factor, however, in using these tools is the value of the message. Communities revolve around user-valuable messages (information, support, tips & tricks, etc.) and NOT promotional messages.
 Community Infrastructure and Governance - Some communities engage the participation of their customers in the role of elected officials, advisory board members, and volunteer "guru" status in order to exemplify key customers in their communities.
 Partnerships - Although this is often a purely Public relations strategy, some people view partnerships with non-profit consumer advocacy organizations to be a Community Marketing effort.

The power of community in marketing

 Community costs less
Some of the world's strongest brands were originally built through low-cost community-based marketing. Nike Inc., Starbucks and Google are some examples. When companies focus on meeting customer needs, they don't have to spend big money to attract new customers. And when they stay close to their communities they don't need market research to tell them what people want.
Kiehl's, a renowned global body-care brand now owned by L'Oreal, for example has people from around the world make pilgrimages to the original New York City store. Kiehl's packaging is plain, its stores are basic and from its 1851 founding until today, the brand has never advertised. Success has been driven by products tailored to customers' needs, word-of-mouth promotion, free in-store product trials and the personal connections forged by requiring active community involvement of every employee.

 Community Grows Loyalty
The topmost human needs are having a sense of belonging and the feeling of being understood. These needs are most often met through families, clubs and communities. When companies begin to focus on building communities, it makes a powerful impact that forges emotional bonds. When a new community is established, people who once felt left out now find kindred spirits. They begin to have a place to belong. When an existing community is strengthened, people who once felt marginalized now find validation. They discover that they have an important role to play.
While its brand image is brash and unapologetically competitive, Nike has done an amazing job of connecting with under-appreciated consumer segments and fostering communities that build empowerment, from making running mainstream, to supporting inner-city basketball, to empowering girls as athletes. The reward has been intense customer loyalty.

 Community Maintains Authenticity
Community brands remain relevant because they're constantly adapting to the changing needs, interests and values of the people who give them meaning. Starbucks originally provided the caffeine addicts a "theater of coffee" experience, with each nuance carefully engineered. As more newcomers joined the tribe, baristas were trained to educate them on coffee exotica, developing a dimension of accessible adventure for the brand. When technology caused a convergence of work and home life, Starbucks lost its individuality and it was not a much sought out place for coffee due to the emerging baristas. Starbucks responded by tapping the larger cultural trend of consumption-based self-expression to offer an endlessly configurable array of unique toppings, ingredients and preparation techniques inspired by customer requests and baristas' creativity. While Starbucks has stumbled of late, it's telling that upon his return to reinvent the company, CEO Howard Schultz quickly reached out to the community by establishing mystarbucksidea.com.

 Community Drives Innovation
Growth and innovation are fueled by a passionate brand community. Vans, originally a maker of cheap deck shoes, followed the interests of its dedicated customers to expand into custom surf shoes, surf competitions, skateboarding shoes and gear, skateboard parks, touring music festivals and even a feature film. And within each of those businesses, new products, features and ways of marketing were generated through a continuous flow of ideas from the grassroots.
Harley-Davidson understood that while its community shared a core passion for the brand, they also had a wide variety of unfulfilled needs and challenges. By methodically focusing on meeting these, the company built substantial new businesses around motorcycle customization, riding gear, motorcycle-inspired fashion and home decoration. It also created the largest motorcycle club in the world, motorcycle rentals and rider training businesses, a museum, shipping and travel services, and even destination cafés.

 Community Supports Natural Reinvention
In times of change, businesses must often reinvent themselves to survive. Yet the impulse for many is to hunker down, wait for the tide to turn and worry about changing later. This both increases the risk of failure and misses the opportunity to energize employees and jump back into competition. By engaging the community-starting with customers, but extending to channel partners, employees, government, society and investors-a company can reinvent itself in an organic way. Products and activities that are no longer adding value can be eliminated, freeing up resources for new initiatives.
Focusing activities on understanding and meeting the community's changing needs keeps spending in check while seeding new growth and laying the foundation for expansion. Lou Gerstner reinvented IBM in this way. Under pressure to dismantle the massive organization, Gerstner instead initiated "Operation Bear Hug," tasking executives across the company with reaching out to their most important customers and discovering their most pressing challenges. This led to the insight that IBM's real strength was as a provider of integrated solutions-and its reinvention as the "e-business" company.
In tough times more than ever, people crave a sense of community support. When companies provide this-by building communities that deliver tangible and emotional value, through employees and customers working together to solve collective challenges-they build lasting bonds of loyalty and discover new sources of growth. Good marketing always puts people at the center. Smart marketing in tough times taps the collective power of community.

References

 Community Oriented Marketing: The Definitive Guide to Enlightened Business Development by Ian Bryan (February 2004 - )

Types of marketing
Promotion and marketing communications